Corporatocracy (from corporate and ; short form corpocracy) is an economic, political and judicial system controlled by corporations or corporate interests.

The concept has been used in explanations of bank bailouts, excessive pay for CEOs, as well as complaints such as the exploitation of national treasuries, people, and natural resources. It has been used by critics of globalization, sometimes in conjunction with criticism of the World Bank or unfair lending practices, as well as criticism of free trade agreements. Corporate rule is also a common theme in dystopian science-fiction media.

Use of "corporatocracy" and similar ideas
Historian Howard Zinn argues that during the Gilded Age in the United States, the U.S. government was acting exactly as Karl Marx described capitalist states: "pretending neutrality to maintain order, but serving the interests of the rich".

According to economist Joseph Stiglitz, there has been a severe increase in the market power of corporations, largely due to U.S. antitrust laws being weakened by neoliberal reforms, leading to growing income inequality and a generally underperforming economy. He states that to improve the economy, it is necessary to decrease the influence of money on U.S. politics.

In his 1956 book The Power Elite, sociologist C Wright Mills stated that together with the military and political establishment, leaders of the biggest corporations form a "power elite," which is in control of the U.S.

Economist Jeffrey Sachs described the United States as a corporatocracy in The Price of Civilization (2011). He suggested that it arose from four trends: weak national parties and strong political representation of individual districts, the large U.S. military establishment after World War II, large corporations using money to finance election campaigns, and globalization tilting the balance of power away from workers.
 
In 2013, economist Edmund Phelps criticized the economic system of the U.S. and other western countries in recent decades as being what he calls "the new corporatism," which he characterizes as a system in which the state is far too involved in the economy and is tasked with "protecting everyone against everyone else," but at the same time, big companies have a great deal of influence on the government, with lobbyists' suggestions being "welcome, especially if they come with bribes."

Corporate influence on politics in the United States

Corruption
During the Gilded Age in the United States, corruption was rampant, as business leaders spent significant amounts of money ensuring that government did not regulate their activities.

Corporate influence on legislation

Corporations have a significant influence on the regulations and regulators that monitor them. For example, Senator Elizabeth Warren explained in December 2014 how an omnibus spending bill required to fund the government was modified late in the process to weaken banking regulations. The modification made it easier to allow taxpayer-funded bailouts of banking "swaps entities", which the Dodd-Frank banking regulations prohibited. She singled out Citigroup, one of the largest banks, which had a role in modifying the legislation. She also explained how both Wall Street bankers and members of the government that formerly had worked on Wall Street stopped bi-partisan legislation that would have broken up the largest banks. She repeated President Theodore Roosevelt's warnings regarding powerful corporate entities that threatened the "very foundations of Democracy."

In a 2015 interview, former President Jimmy Carter stated that the United States is now "an oligarchy with unlimited political bribery" due to the Citizens United v. FEC ruling, which effectively removed limits on donations to political candidates. Wall Street spent a record $2 billion trying to influence the 2016 United States elections.

Joel Bakan, a University of British Columbia law professor and the author of the award-winning book The Corporation: The Pathological Pursuit of Profit and Power, writes:

Perceived symptoms of corporatocracy in the United States

Share of income

With regard to income inequality, the 2014 income analysis of the University of California, Berkeley economist Emmanuel Saez confirms that relative growth of income and wealth is not occurring among small and mid-sized entrepreneurs and business owners (who generally populate the lower half of top one per-centers in income), but instead only among the top .1 percent of the income distribution, who earn $2,000,000 or more every year.

Corporate power can also increase income inequality. Nobel Prize winner of economics Joseph Stiglitz wrote in May 2011: "Much of today’s inequality is due to manipulation of the financial system, enabled by changes in the rules that have been bought and paid for by the financial industry itself—one of its best investments ever. The government lent money to financial institutions at close to zero percent interest and provided generous bailouts on favorable terms when all else failed. Regulators turned a blind eye to a lack of transparency and to conflicts of interest." Stiglitz explained that the top 1% got nearly "one-quarter" of the income and own approximately 40% of the wealth.

Measured relative to GDP, total compensation and its component wages and salaries have been declining since 1970. This indicates a shift in income from labor (persons who derive income from hourly wages and salaries) to capital (persons who derive income via ownership of businesses, land, and assets).

Larry Summers estimated in 2007 that the lower 80% of families were receiving $664 billion less income than they would be with a 1979 income distribution, or approximately $7,000 per family. Not receiving this income may have led many families to increase their debt burden, a significant factor in the 2007–2009 subprime mortgage crisis, as highly leveraged homeowners suffered a much larger reduction in their net worth during the crisis. Further, since lower income families tend to spend relatively more of their income than higher income families, shifting more of the income to wealthier families may slow economic growth.

Effective corporate tax rates

Some large U.S. corporations have used a strategy called tax inversion to change their headquarters to a non-U.S. country to reduce their tax liability. About 46 companies have reincorporated in low-tax countries since 1982, including 15 since 2012. Six more also planned to do so in 2015.

Stock buybacks versus wage increases
One indication of increasing corporate power was the removal of restrictions on their ability to buy back stock, contributing to increased income inequality. Writing in the Harvard Business Review in September 2014, William Lazonick blamed record corporate stock buybacks for reduced investment in the economy and a corresponding impact on prosperity and income inequality. Between 2003 and 2012, the 449 companies in the S&P 500 used 54% of their earnings ($2.4 trillion) to buy back their own stock. An additional 37% was paid to stockholders as dividends. Together, these were 91% of profits. This left little for investment in productive capabilities or higher income for employees, shifting more income to capital rather than labor. He blamed executive compensation arrangements, which are heavily based on stock options, stock awards, and bonuses, for meeting earnings per share (EPS) targets. EPS increases as the number of outstanding shares decreases. Legal restrictions on buybacks were greatly eased in the early 1980s. He advocates changing these incentives to limit buybacks.

In the 12 months to March 31, 2014, S&P 500 companies increased their stock buyback payouts by 29% year on year, to $534.9 billion. U.S. companies are projected to increase buybacks to $701 billion in 2015, according to Goldman Sachs, an 18% increase over 2014. For scale, annual non-residential fixed investment (a proxy for business investment and a major GDP component) was estimated to be about $2.1 trillion for 2014.

Industry concentration

Brid Brennan of the Transnational Institute explained how the concentration of corporations increases their influence over government: "It's not just their size, their enormous wealth and assets that make the TNCs [transnational corporations] dangerous to democracy. It's also their concentration, their capacity to influence, and often infiltrate, governments and their ability to act as a genuine international social class in order to defend their commercial interests against the common good. It is such decision-making power as well as the power to impose deregulation over the past 30 years, resulting in changes to national constitutions, and to national and international legislation which has created the environment for corporate crime and impunity." Brennan concludes that this concentration in power leads to again more concentration of income and wealth.

An example of such industry concentration is in banking. The top 5 U.S. banks had approximately 30% of the U.S. banking assets in 1998; this rose to 45% by 2008 and to 48% by 2010, before falling to 47% in 2011.

The Economist also explained how an increasingly profitable corporate financial and banking sector caused Gini coefficients to rise in the U.S. since 1980: "Financial services' share of GDP in America, doubled to 8% between 1980 and 2000; over the same period their profits rose from about 10% to 35% of total corporate profits, before collapsing in 2007–09. Bankers are being paid more, too. In America the compensation of workers in financial services was similar to average compensation until 1980. Now it is twice that average."

See also 

Works
 Jennifer Government
 The Corporation (film)
 The Power Elite (book)
 Zeitgeist: The Movie

References

Further reading
 
 Shatalova, Yaroslavna Oleksandrivna. "Corporatocracy Concept In The Scope Of A Socio-Philosophical Analysis." European Journal of Humanities and Social Sciences 6 (2017): 133–137.

External links 

 lecture on Corporatocracy John Perkins lecture on Corporatocracy
 Crimes of Globalization: The Impact of U.S. Corporatocracy in Third World Countries by John Flores-Hidones

Corruption
Economic ideologies
Oligarchy
Political theories
Political systems
Cyberpunk themes

Pejorative terms for forms of government